Liu Jianfu (c. 1918 – 8 June 2018) was a Chinese police official and politician who served as police chief and deputy mayor of Beijing.

Biography
Liu was born in Lingqiu County, Shanxi Province. He enlisted in the Eighth Route Army in 1937 and joined the Communist Party of China in 1938. He served in Yan'an, the Communist headquarters during the Second Sino-Japanese War. In August 1945, he became the head of security in charge of the safety of top leaders including Mao Zedong, Zhou Enlai, and Ren Bishi.

After the establishment of the People's Republic of China in 1949, Liu worked in the police departments in Beijing, Hubei, Guangzhou, and Anshan. After the Cultural Revolution, he was appointed the police chief of Beijing in July 1977 and later deputy mayor of Beijing.

Liu retired in 1997. He died on 8 June 2018 in Beijing Hospital, at the age of 100.

References 

1910s births
2018 deaths
Chinese centenarians
Chinese police officers
Deputy mayors of Beijing
Men centenarians
Politicians from Datong